EBK4 is the third studio album by American rapper Brotha Lynch Hung, released through Blackmarket Records on June 27, 2000 as a follow-up to 1997's Loaded. Some of the songs on the album were not completed (did not have all the verses recorded, etc.) in time for the release date. Due to disputes with the record label over this and other issues, Black Market released the album without the consent of Brotha Lynch Hung, featuring other artists off the label to complete unfinished songs where extra verses were needed. Lynch has mentioned that a home invasion happened where the thieves had took songs in progress, which comprises this album.

Overview
Despite the controversy surrounding its release, EBK4 is notable for featuring a guest appearance from Snoop Dogg on the track "Dogg Market." It is also notable for Lynch's cover of label-mate X-Raided's track "Every Single Bitch" from his debut album, Psycho Active.

Track listing

Personnel

Brotha Lynch Hung – vocals
Phonk Beta – production
Cedric Singleton – executive producer, album layout
Khan – photography
Seasone Zachary – marketing/"Media Assassin"
Clyde Anthony Polk – project management
Bad Credit – project management 
Serious F/X – album cover artwork

References

Brotha Lynch Hung albums
2000 albums